The economy of Malaysia is the fifth largest in Southeast Asia and the 38th largest in the world in terms of GDP. The 2018 labour productivity of Malaysia was measured at Int$55,360 per worker, the third highest in ASEAN. The 2021 Global Competitiveness Report ranked Malaysian economy the 25th most competitive country economy in the world.

Malaysians enjoy a relatively affluent lifestyle compared to many of its neighbours in Southeast Asia. This is due to a fast-growing export-oriented economy, a relatively low national income tax, highly affordable local food and transport fuel, as well as a fully subsidized single-payer public healthcare system. Malaysia has a newly industrialised market economy, which is relatively open and state-oriented. The Malaysian economy is highly robust and diversified with the export value of high-tech products in 2020 standing at US$92.1 billion, the second highest in ASEAN. Malaysia exports the second largest volume and value of palm oil products globally, after Indonesia.

History

As one of three countries that control the Strait of Malacca, international trade plays a very significant role in Malaysia's economy. At one time, it was the largest producer of tin, rubber and palm oil in the world.
Manufacturing has a large influence in the country's economy, accounting for over 40% of the GDP. Malaysia is also the world's largest Islamic banking and financial centre.

In the 1970s, Malaysia began to imitate the four Asian Tiger economies (Hong Kong, Singapore, South Korea, and Taiwan) and committed itself to a transition from being reliant on mining and agriculture to an economy that depends more on manufacturing. In the 1970s, the predominantly mining and agricultural based Malaysian economy began a transition towards a more multi-sector economy. Since the 1980s the industrial sector has led Malaysia's growth. High levels of investment played a significant role in this. With Japanese investment, heavy industries flourished and in a matter of years, Malaysian exports became the country's primary growth engine. Malaysia consistently achieved more than 7% GDP growth along with low inflation in the 1980s and the 1990s.

In 1991, former Prime Minister of Malaysia, Mahathir bin Mohamad outlined his ideal, Vision 2020 in which Malaysia would become a self-sufficient industrialised nation by 2020. Tan Sri Nor Mohamed, a government minister, said Malaysia could attain developed country status in 2018 if the country's growth remains constant or increases.

Malaysia experienced an economic boom and underwent rapid development during the late 20th century and has GDP per capita (nominal) of US$11,062.043 in 2014, and is considered a newly industrialised country. In 2009, the PPP GDP was US$383.6 billion, about half the 2014 amount, and the PPP per capita GDP was US$8,100, about one third the 2014 amount.

In 2014, the Household Income Survey undertaken by the government indicated that there were 7 million households in Malaysia, with an average of 4.3 members in each household. The average household income of Malaysia increased by 18% to RM5,900 a month, compared to RM5,000 in 2012.

According to a HSBC report in 2012, Malaysia will become the world's 21st largest economy by 2050, with a GDP of $1.2 trillion (Year 2000 dollars) and a GDP per capita of $29,247 (Year 2000 dollars). The report also says "The electronic equipment, petroleum, and liquefied natural gas producer will see a substantial increase in income per capita. Malaysian life expectancy, relatively high level of schooling, and above average fertility rate will help in its rapid expansion." Viktor Shvets, the managing director in Credit Suisse, has said "Malaysia has all the right ingredients to become a developed nation."

In the beginning of 2020, Malaysian economy was severely afflicted by COVID-19 pandemic that eventually expanded to the rest of the world, and causing the economic shutdown and downturn in the country, worse since 2008. In early December 2020 during the pandemic, Fitch Ratings downgraded the country’s rating from A− to BBB+. Some, such as Hoo Ke Ping at the Kingsley Strategic Institute, suggested that this was because of a lack of communication between the new government and the ratings agency. Others, such as Carmelo Ferlito, from the Centre for Market Education, said it might require something more substantial as the recent budget lacked a strategy for the recovery as well as addressing the political tensions, and also, Shan Saeed at Juwai IQI suggested that the agency had lots its relevance as the analysis was "Behind the curve". However, COVID-19 recession in the country was ended by 1 April 2022 as COVID-19 Deltacron hybrid infection rate continued to fall and ahead of the endemic phase.

Economic policies

Monetary policy
Malaysian ringgit was an internationalised currency, which was freely traded around the world. Just before the crisis, the Ringgit was traded RM2.50 at the dollar. Due to speculative activities, the Ringgit fell to as much as RM4.10 to the dollar in matter of weeks. Bank Negara Malaysia, the nation's central bank, decided to impose capital controls to prevent the outflow of the Ringgit in the open market. The Ringgit became non-internationalised and a traveller had to declare to the central bank if taking out more than RM10,000 out of the country and the Ringgit itself was pegged at RM3.80 to the US dollar.

The fixed exchange rate was abandoned in favour of the floating exchange rate in July 2005, hours after China announced the same move. At this point, the Ringgit was still not internationalised. The Ringgit continued to strengthen to 3.18 to the dollar by March 2008 and appreciated as low as 2.94 to the dollar in May 2011. Meanwhile, many aspects of capital control have been slowly relaxed by Bank Negara Malaysia. However, the government continues to not internationalise the Ringgit. The government stated that the Ringgit will be internationalised once it is ready.

Bank Negara Malaysia for the time being, uses interest rate targeting. The Overnight Policy Rate (OPR) is their policy instrument, and is used to guide the short term interbank rates which will hopefully influence inflation and economic growth.

Affirmative action

Tun Abdul Razak, who was then the Prime Minister, implemented the affirmative action policy named as New Economic Policy (NEP) soon after 13 May Incident in 1969. Prior to the incident, the poverty rates among Malays were extremely high (at 65%) as was discontent between races, particularly towards the Chinese, who controlled 74% of the economy at the time. Through NEP, the Bumiputeras majority are given priority and special privileges in housing developments, scholarship admission and also for ownership of publicly listed companies.

The Malaysian New Economic Policy was created in 1971 with the aim of bringing Malays a 30% share of the economy of Malaysia and eradicating poverty amongst Malays, primarily through encouraging enterprise ownership by Bumiputeras. After 40 years of the program, bumiputra equity ownership rose to 23% worth RM167.7 billion in 2010 against 2.4% in 1970.

The NEP is accused of creating an oligarchy, and creating a 'subsidy mentality'. Political parties such as Parti Keadilan Rakyat and Democratic Action Party have proposed a new policy which will be equal for every Malaysian, regardless of race. When the Democratic Action Party was elected in the state of Penang in 2008, it announced that it will do away with the NEP, claiming that it "... breeds nepotism, corruption and systemic inefficiency".

Wolfgang Kasper, a professor of economics at University of New South Wales, and once an adviser to Malaysia's Finance Ministry, criticised the NEP, saying that "NEP handouts (are) making Malays lazy, corrupt & swell-headed. Worst of all, it keeps them poor." He also criticised the Federal Government giving cash-handouts and financial aid instead of providing equal access to education to help the marginalised poor to lift their income status.

On 21 April 2009, the prime minister Najib Tun Razak has announced the liberalisation of 27 services sub-sector by abolishing the 30% bumiputera requirement. The move is seen as the government efforts to increase investment in the service sector of the economy. According to the premier, many more sectors of the economy will be liberalised.

On 30 June 2009, the prime minister announces further liberation moves including the dismantling of the Bumiputera equity quotas and repealing the guidelines of the Foreign Investment Committee, which was responsible to monitor foreign shareholding in Malaysian companies. However, any Malaysian companies that wishes to list in Malaysia would still need to offer 50 percent of public shareholding spread to Bumiputera investors.

Subsidies and price controls

The Malaysian government subsidises and controls prices on a lot of essential items to keep the prices low. Prices of items such as palm oil, cooking oil, petrol, flour, bread, rice and other essentials have been kept under market prices to keep cost of living low. As of 2009, 22 per cent of government expenditures were subsidies, with petrol subsidies alone taking up 12 per cent.

Since 2010, the government has been gradually reforming Malaysia's subsidy system, via a series of reductions in subsidies for fuel and sugar to improve government finances and to improve economic efficiency. As a result, in December 2014, the government officially ended all fuel subsidies and implemented a 'managed float' system, taking advantage of low oil prices at the time, potentially saving the government almost RM20 billion ringgit (US$5.97 billion) annually.

Sovereign wealth funds

The government owns and operates several sovereign wealth funds that invest in local companies and also foreign companies. One such fund is Khazanah Nasional Berhad which was established in 1993, and as of 31 December 2013 has US$41 billion worth of assets. The fund invests in major companies in Malaysia such as CIMB in the banking sector, UEM Group in the construction sector, Telekom Malaysia and Axiata in the communications industry, Malaysia Airports and Malaysia Airlines in the aerospace industry, as well as Tenaga Nasional in the energy sector

Another fund that is owned by the Malaysian government is the Employees Provident Fund which is a retirement fund that as of 31 March 2014, has an asset size of RM597 billion. (US$184 billion), making it the fourth largest pension fund in Asia and seventh largest in the world. Like Khazanah Nasional, the EPF invests and sometimes owns several major companies in Malaysia such as RHB Bank. EPF investment is diversified over a number of sectors but almost 40% of their investment are in the services sector.

Permodalan Nasional Berhad is another major fund manager controlled by the Malaysian Government. It offers capital guaranteed mutual funds such as Amanah Saham Bumiputera and Amanah Saham Wawasan 2020 which are open only to Malaysian and in some cases, Bumiputeras.

Government influence
Although the federal government promotes private enterprise and ownership in the economy, the economic direction of the country is heavily influenced by the government through five years development plans since independence. The economy is also influenced by the government through agencies such as the Economic Planning Unit and government-linked wealth funds such as Khazanah Nasional Berhad, Employees Provident Fund and Permodalan Nasional Berhad.

The government's development plans, called the Malaysian Plan, currently the Tenth Malaysia Plan, started in 1950 during the British colonial rule. The plans were largely centred around accelerating the growth of the economy by selectively investing in selective sectors of the economy and building infrastructure to support said sectors. For example, in the current national plan, three sectors – agriculture, manufacturing and services, will receive special attention to promote the transition to high value-added activities in the respective areas.

Government-linked investment vehicles such as Khazanah Nasional Berhad, Employees Provident Fund and Permodalan Nasional Berhad invest in and sometimes own major companies in major sectors of the Malaysian economy.

Data 
The following table shows the main economic indicators in 1980–2021 (with IMF staff estimates in 2022–2027). Inflation below 5% is in green.

Currency

The only legal tender in Malaysia is the Malaysian ringgit. As of 28 January 2023, the ringgit is traded at MYR 4.24 at the US dollar.

The ringgit has not been internationalised since September 1998, an effect due to the 1997 Asian financial crisis in which the central bank imposed capital controls on the currency, due to speculative short-selling of the ringgit. As a part of series of capital controls, the currency was pegged between September 1998 to 21 July 2005 at MYR 3.80 to the dollar after the value of the ringgit dropped from MYR 2.50 per USD to, at one point, MYR 4.80 per USD.

In recent years, Bank Negara Malaysia has begun to relax certain rules to the capital controls although the currency itself is still not traded internationally yet. According to the Bank Governor, the ringgit will be internationalised when it's ready.

In September 2010, in an interview with CNBC, Dato' Seri Najib Tun Razak, who is the then Prime Minister of Malaysia and also held the position of Finance Minister then, said that the government is open to open up the ringgit to off shore trading if the move will help the economy. He further added that before such a move can be made, it will ensure that rules and regulation will be in place so the currency will not be abused.

Natural resources

Malaysia is well-endowed with natural resources in areas such as agriculture, forestry and minerals. It is an exporter of natural and agricultural resources, the most valuable exported resource being petroleum. In the agricultural sector, Malaysia is one of the top exporters of natural rubber and palm oil, which together with timber and timber products, cocoa, pepper, pineapple and tobacco dominate the growth of the sector. As of 2011, the percentage arable land in Malaysia is 5.44%. Croplands consists of 17.49% while other land uses consists of 77.07%. As of 2009, irrigated land covers 3,800 km2. Total renewable water resources make up 580 cubic km as of 2011.

Tin and petroleum are the two main mineral resources that are of major significance in the Malaysian economy. Malaysia was once the world's largest producer of tin until the collapse of the tin market in the early 1980s. In the 19th and 20th century, tin played a predominant role in the Malaysian economy, with Malaysia accounting for over 31% of global output. It was only in 1972 that petroleum and natural gas took over from tin as the mainstay of the mineral extraction sector. Other minerals of some importance or significance include copper, bauxite, iron-ore and coal together with industrial minerals like clay, kaolin, silica, limestone, barite, phosphates and dimension stones such as granite as well as marble blocks and slabs. Small quantities of gold are produced.

In 2019, the country was the 11th largest world producer of manganese; the 11th largest world producer of tin, the 12th largest world producer of bauxite, and the 19th largest world producer of lime.

Energy resources 
Malaysia holds proven oil reserves of 4 billion barrels as of January 2014, the fourth-highest reserves in Asia-Pacific after China, India, and Vietnam. Nearly all of Malaysia's oil comes from offshore fields. The continental shelf is divided into three producing basins: the basin offshore Eastern Peninsular Malaysia in the west and the Sarawak and Sabah basins in the east. Most of the country's oil reserves are located in the Peninsular basin and tend to be light and sweet crude. Malaysia's benchmark crude oil, Tapis Blend, is a light and sweet crude oil, with an API gravity of 42.7° and a sulphur content of 0.04% by weight.

Malaysia also holds 83 trillion cubic feet (Tcf) of proven natural gas reserves as of January 2014, and was the third-largest natural gas reserve holder in the Asia-Pacific region after China and Indonesia. More than half of the country's natural gas reserves are located in its eastern areas, predominantly offshore Sarawak. Most of Malaysia's gas reserves are associated with oil basins, although Sarawak and Sabah have an increasing amount of non-associated gas reserves that have offset some of the declines from mature oil and gas basins offshore Peninsular Malaysia.

Business environment

In 2015, Malaysia's economy was one of the most competitive in the world, ranking 14th in the world and 5th for countries with a population of over 20 million, higher than countries like Australia, United Kingdom, South Korea and Japan.

In 2015, Malaysia was the 6th most attractive country for foreign investors, ranked in the Baseline Profitability Index (BPI) published by Foreign Policy Magazine.

The government is moving towards a more business friendly environment by setting up a special task force to facilitate business called PEMUDAH, which means "simplifier" in Malay. Highlights includes easing restrictions and requirement to hire expatriates, shorten time to do land transfers and increasing the limit of sugar storage (a controlled item in Malaysia) for companies.

Malaysia was ranked 33rd in the Global Innovation Index in 2020, up from 35th in 2019.

Taxation 
In 2016, the Inland Revenue Board of Malaysia lowered the effective tax rate to 24% for businesses with capital exceeding 2.5 million ringgit. For the smaller companies, the rate is 19%.

The Malaysian government also imposes government taxes such as the Sales and Services tax and real estate taxes. The current rate of SST is at 6% while disposal of property is subject to a schedule of period holding the property.

External trade

In 2021, Malaysia's total external trade totaled RM2,227 billion (approximately US$530 billion), made up of RM1,239 billion (approximately US$295 billion) of exports and RM987 billion (approximately US$235 billion) of imports, making Malaysia the world's 21st largest exporter and the world's 25th largest importer.

Malaysia's largest trading partner is China. Malaysia has been China's top trading partner within ASEAN for five years in a row since 2008. The two-way trade volume between China and Malaysia in 2013 reached $106 billion, making Malaysia China's third-largest trade partner in Asia, just behind Japan and South Korea and eighth largest overall. On 31 May 2014, during Najib Razak's visit to China where he was welcomed by China's Premier Li Keqiang, China and Malaysia pledged to increase bilateral trade to US$160 billion by 2017. They also agreed to upgrade economic and financial co-operation, especially in the production of halal food, water processing and railway construction.

Malaysia's second largest trading partner is Singapore and Malaysia is Singapore's biggest trading partner, with bilateral trade totalling roughly US$91 billion in 2012, accounting for over a fifth of total trade within ASEAN.

Malaysia's third largest trading partner is Japan, amounting RM137.45 billion (US$42 billion) of trade in 2014, an increase of 1.4% compared with to 2013. Out of this, exports totalled RM82.71 billion (US$25.6 billion), a growth of 4.4% cent while imports contracted 2.9% to RM54.75 billion (US$16.74 billion). Malaysian Ambassador to Japan Datuk Ahmad Izlan Idris said the main exports from Malaysia to Japan were liquefied natural gas (LNG), electrical and electronics as well as chemical-based products. He said Malaysia's main imports from Japan were electrical and electronics, machines and equipment as well as spare parts and accessories for vehicles and cars.

Malaysia is an important trading partner for the United States. In 1999, two-way bilateral trade between the US and Malaysia totalled US$30.5 billion, with US exports to Malaysia totalling US$9.1 billion and US imports from Malaysia increasing to US$21.4 billion. Malaysia was the United States' 10th-largest trading partner and its 12th-largest export market. During the first half of 2000, US exports totalled US$5 billion, while US imports from Malaysia reached US$11.6 billion.

Agriculture sector 

Agriculture is now a minor sector of the Malaysian economy, accounting for 7.1% of Malaysia's GDP in 2014 and employing 11.1% of Malaysia's labour force, contrasting with the 1960s when agriculture accounted for 37% of Malaysia's GDP and employed 66.2% of the labour force. The crops grown by the agricultural sector has also significantly shifted from food crops like paddy and coconut to industrial crops like palm oil and rubber, which in 2005 contributed to 83.7% of total agricultural land use, compared to 68.5% in 1960.

Palm Oil Industry

Though Indonesia produces more palm oil, Malaysia is the world's largest exporter of palm oil having exported 18 million tonnes of palm oil products in 2011.

In March 2019, the European Commission concluded that palm oil cultivation results in excessive deforestation and its use in transport fuel should be phased out by 2030. In response, Mahathir Mohamad alleged that the European Union is at risk of starting a trade war with Malaysia regarding its "grossly unfair" policies geared towards decreasing the use of palm oil, which Mahathir stated was "unfair" and an example of "rich people...[trying] to impoverish poor people".

Industry sector
Science policies in Malaysia are regulated by the Ministry of Science, Technology, and Innovation. The country is one of the world's largest exporters of semiconductor devices, electrical devices, and IT and communication products.

Malaysia's industrial sector accounts for 36.8%, over a third of the country's GDP in 2014, and employs 36% of the labour force in 2012. The industrial sector mostly contributed by the electronics industry, automotive industry and construction industry.

Electrical and electronics 
The electrical & electronics (E&E) industry is the leading sector in Malaysia's manufacturing sector, contributing significantly to the country's exports (32.8 per cent) and employment (27.2 per cent) in 2013. Malaysia benefits from the global demand in the usage of mobile devices (smartphones, tablets), storage devices (cloud computing, data centres), optoelectronics (photonics, fibre optics, LEDs) and embedded technology (integrated circuits, PCBs, LEDs).

Electronic components 

Products/activities which fall under this sub-sector include semiconductor devices, passive components, printed circuits and other components such as media, substrates and connectors.

Within the electronic components sub-sector, the semiconductor devices is the leading contributor of exports for the E&E industry. Exports of semiconductor devices were RM111.19 billion or 47% of the total E&E products exported in 2013.

Malaysia is a major hub for electrical component manufacturing, with factories of international companies like Intel, AMD, Freescale Semiconductor, ASE, Infineon, STMicroelectronics, Texas Instruments, Fairchild Semiconductor, Renesas, X-Fab and major Malaysian-owned companies such as Green Packet, Silterra, Globetronics, Unisem and Inari which have contributed to the steady growth of the semiconductor industry in Malaysia. To date, there are more than 50 companies, largely MNCs producing semiconductors devices in Malaysia.

Photovoltaics 
Malaysia is a major hub for solar equipment manufacturing, with factories of companies like First Solar, Panasonic, TS Solartech, Jinko Solar, JA Solar, SunPower, Hanwha Q Cells, and SunEdison in locations like Kulim, Penang, Malacca, Cyberjaya and Ipoh.
In 2013, Malaysia's total production capacity for solar wafers, solar cells and solar panels totalled 4,042 MW. By 2014, Malaysia was the world's third largest manufacturer of photovoltaics equipment, behind China and the European Union.

Many international companies have the majority of production capacity located in Malaysia, such as the American company First Solar which has over 2,000 MW of production capacity located in Kulim and only 280 MW located in Ohio, and formerly German-based Hanwha Q Cells which produces 1,100 MW worth of solar cells in Cyberjaya while producing only 200 MW worth of solar cells in Germany. SunPower's largest manufacturing facility with a capacity of 1,400 MW is also located in Malacca.

Automotive 

The automotive industry in Malaysia consists of 27 vehicle producers and over 640 component manufacturers. The Malaysian automotive industry is the third largest in Southeast Asia, and the 23rd largest in the world, with an annual production output of over 500,000 vehicles. The automotive industry contributes 4% or RM 40 billion to Malaysia's GDP, and employs a workforce of over 700,000 throughout a nationwide ecosystem.

The Malaysian automotive industry is Southeast Asia's sole pioneer of indigenous car companies, namely Proton and Perodua. In 2002, Proton helped Malaysia become the 11th country in the world with the capability to fully design, engineer and manufacture cars from the ground up. The Malaysian automotive industry also hosts several domestic-foreign joint venture companies, which assemble a large variety of vehicles from imported complete knock down (CKD) kits.

Malaysia's first tech unicorn startup, automotive e-commerce platform Carsome, raised $290 million in a Series E funding round to expand its product, technology and infrastructure in Malaysia, Indonesia and Thailand. This latest funding round values the used-car online marketplace at $1.7 billion.

Construction 

Malaysia has a large construction industry of over RM102.2 billion (US$32 billion). The highest percentage share was contributed by construction of non-residential buildings which recorded 34.6 per cent. This was followed by civil engineering sub-sector (30.6%), residential buildings (29.7%), and special trades (5.1%).

Selangor recorded the highest value of construction work done at 24.5% among the states, followed by Johor at 16.5%, Kuala Lumpur at 15.8%, Sarawak at 8.6% and Penang at 6.4%. The contribution of these five states accounted for 71.8% of the total value of construction work in Malaysia.

The expansion of the construction industry has been catalysed by major capital expenditure projects, and a key factor has been the government's Economic Transformation Programme (ETP) and public-private partnership (PPP) mega-projects like Tun Razak Exchange, KVMRT and Iskandar Malaysia.

Defence 

Malaysia has a relatively new defence industry that was created after the government created the Malaysia Defence Industry Council to encourage local companies to participate in the country's defence sector in 1999.

The land sector of the defence industry is dominated by DefTech, a subsidiary of Malaysia's largest automotive manufacturer, DRB-HICOM. The company focuses on manufacturing armoured vehicles and specialised logistics vehicles. The company has supplied ACV-15 infantry fighting vehicles to the Malaysian Army in the past and is currently supplying the DefTech AV8 amphibious multirole armoured vehicle to the Malaysian Army.

The sea sector of the defence industry is dominated by Boustead Heavy Industries, who builds warships for the Royal Malaysian Navy (RMN) through transfer of technology with foreign companies. The company has built 4 Kedah-class offshore patrol vessels for the RMN in the past and is currently undertaking a project to build 6 more Second Generation Patrol Vessels for the RMN.

Services sector

Finance and banking

Kuala Lumpur has a large financial sector, and is ranked the 22nd in the world in the Global Financial Centres Index.
There are currently 27 commercial banks (8 domestic and 19 foreign), 16 Islamic banks (10 domestic and 6 foreign), 15 investment banks (all domestic) and 2 other financial institutions (both domestic) operating in Malaysia.

Commercial banks are the largest and most significant providers of funds in the banking system. The biggest banks in Malaysia's finance sector are Maybank, CIMB, Public Bank Berhad, RHB Bank and AmBank.

Malaysia is currently also the world's largest centre of Islamic Finance. Malaysia has 16 fully-fledged Islamic banks including five foreign ones, with total Islamic bank assets of US$168.4 billion, which accounts for 25% of the Malaysia's total banking assets. This in turn accounts for over 10% of the world's total Islamic banking assets. In comparison, Malaysia's main rival UAE, has US$95 billion of assets.

Malaysia is the global leader in terms of the sukuk (Islamic bond) market, issuing RM62 billion (US$17.74 billion) worth of sukuk in 2014 - over 66.7% of the global total of US$26.6 billion Malaysia also accounts for around two-thirds of the global outstanding sukuk market, controlling $178 billion of $290 billion, the global total.

The Malaysian government is planning to transform the country's capital Kuala Lumpur into a major financial centre in a bid to raise its profile and spark greater international trade and investment through the construction of the Tun Razak Exchange (TRX). The government believes the project will allow Malaysia to compete with regional financial superpowers such as Singapore and Hong Kong, by leveraging on the country's established strength in the rapidly growing Islamic financial marketplace.

Based in Kuala Lumpur, Bursa Malaysia serves as the country's sole national stock exchange. Trading of shares started in 1960 and it is today one of the largest bourses in Southeast Asia.

Tourism

Tourism is a huge sector of the Malaysian economy, with over 57.1 million domestic tourists generating RM37.4 billion (US$11 billion) in tourist receipts in 2014, and attracting 27,437,315 international tourist arrivals, a growth of 6.7% compared to 2013. Total international tourist receipts increased by 3.9% to RM60.6 billion (US$19 billion) in 2014.

United Nations World Tourism Organisation (UNWTO) listed Malaysia as the 10th most visited country in 2012.

Malaysia is rich with diverse natural attractions which become an asset to the country's tourism industry. This was recognised by the World Travel & Tourism Council (WTTC), who declared Malaysia as "a destination full of unrealized potential" with the main strength as the availability of a vast range of diverse attractions to suit all tastes relatively affordable prices and; largely unspoilt destination.

Malaysia's top tourist destinations are the Mulu Caves, Perhentian Islands, Langkawi, Petronas Towers and Mount Kinabalu.

Medical tourism 

Medical tourism is a significant sector of Malaysia's economy, with an estimated 1 million travelling to Malaysia specifically for medical treatments alone in 2014, contributing around US$200 million (about RM697 mil) in revenue to the economy.

Malaysia is reputed as one of the most preferred medical tourism destinations with modern private healthcare facilities and highly efficient medical professionals. In 2014, Malaysia was ranked the world's best destination for medical tourism by the Nomad Capitalist. Malaysia was also included in the top 10 medical tourism destinations list by CNBC.

In 2014, Prince Court Medical Centre, a Malaysian hospital, was ranked the world's best hospital for medical tourists by MTQUA.

The Malaysian government targets to hit RM 9.6 billion (US$3.2 billion) in revenue from 1.9 million foreign patients by 2020.

Oil and gas

Malaysia has a vibrant oil and gas industry. The national oil company, Petronas is ranked the 69th biggest company in the world in the Fortune 500 list in 2014, with a revenue of over US100.7 billion and total assets of over US$169 billion. Petronas provides around 30% of the Malaysian government's revenue, although the government has been actively cutting down on its reliance of petroleum, with a target of 20%.

Petronas is also the custodian of oil and gas reserves for Malaysia. Hence, all oil and gas activities are regulated by Petronas. Malaysia encourages foreign oil company participation through production sharing contracts, in which significant amount of oil will be given away to the foreign oil company until it reaches a production milestone. Currently, many major oil companies such as ExxonMobil, Royal Dutch Shell, Nippon Oil, and Murphy Oil are involved in such contracts. As a result, 40% of oil fields in Malaysia are developed.

There are over 3,500 oil and gas (O&G) businesses in Malaysia comprising international oil companies, independents, services and manufacturing companies that support the needs of the O&G value chain both domestically and regionally. Many major global machinery & equipment (M&E) manufacturers have set up bases in Malaysia to complement home-grown M&E companies, while other Malaysian oil and gas companies are focused on key strategic segments such as marine, drilling, engineering, fabrication, offshore installation and operations and maintenance (O&M).

Infrastructure 
The infrastructure of Malaysia is one of the most developed in Asia. Its telecommunications network is second only to Singapore's in Southeast Asia, with 4.7 million fixed-line subscribers and more than 30 million cellular subscribers.(2011) The country has seven international ports, the major one being the Port Klang. There are 200 industrial parks along with specialised parks such as Technology Park Malaysia and Kulim Hi-Tech Park. Fresh water is available to over 95 per cent of the population. During the colonial period, development was mainly concentrated in economically powerful cities and in areas forming security concerns. Although rural areas have been the focus of great development, they still lag behind areas such as the West Coast of Peninsular Malaysia. The telecommunication network, although strong in urban areas, is less available to the rural population.

Energy 

Malaysia's energy infrastructure sector is largely dominated by Tenaga Nasional, the largest electric utility company in Southeast Asia, with over RM99.03 billion of assets. Customers are connected to electricity through the National Grid, with more than 420 transmission substations in the Peninsular linked together by approximately 11,000 km of transmission lines operating at 132, 275 and 500 kilovolts.

In 2013, Malaysia's total power generation capacity was over 29,728 megawatts. Total electricity generation was 140,985.01 GWh and total electricity consumption was 116,087.51 GWh.

Energy production in Malaysia is largely based on oil and natural gas, owing to Malaysia's oil reserves and natural gas reserves, which is the fourth largest in Asia-Pacific after China, India and Vietnam.

Malaysia has also significant renewable energy resources and has high potential for the development of large-scale solar power and it has one of the most advanced legal frameworks in the ASEAN region for promoting renewables. The country set a 20% target of renewable energy in its energy mix by 2025 and to achieve this the government will need to improve its renewable energy governance, investment policy and market entry for foreign investors as well to develop a framework for easier grid connection and use. As of 2021, Malaysia is one of the major producers of solar panels for the international market, but paradoxically it has yet to fully capitalize on this for domestic electricity generation.

Transport network

Road network 

Most of the federal roads in Malaysia are 2-lane roads. In town areas, federal roads may become 4-lane roads to increase traffic capacity. Nearly all federal roads are paved with tarmac except parts of the Skudai–Pontian Highway which is paved with concrete, while parts of the Federal Highway linking Klang to Kuala Lumpur, is paved with asphalt.

In 2015, the government announced a RM27 billion (US$8.23 billion) Pan-Borneo Highway project to upgrade all trunk roads to dual carriage expressways, bringing the standard of East Malaysian highways to the same level of quality of Peninsular highways.

Rail network 

There are currently  of railways in Malaysia,  are double tracked and electrified.

Rail transport in Malaysia comprises heavy rail (KTM), light rapid transit and monorail (Rapid Rail), and a funicular railway line (Penang Hill Railway). Heavy rail is mostly used for intercity passenger and freight transport as well as some urban public transport, while LRTs are used for intra-city urban public transport. There two commuter rail services linking Kuala Lumpur with the Kuala Lumpur International Airport. The sole monorail line in the country is also used for public transport in Kuala Lumpur, while the only funicular railway line is in Penang. A rapid transit project, the KVMRT, is currently under construction to improve Kuala Lumpur's public transport system.

The railway network covers most of the 11 states in Peninsular Malaysia. In East Malaysia, only the state of Sabah has railways. The network is also connected to the Thai railway  network in the north. If the Burma Railway is rebuilt, services to Myanmar, India, and China could be initiated.

Air network 

Malaysia has 118 airports, of which 38 are paved. The national airline is Malaysia Airlines, providing international and domestic air services. Major international routes and domestic routes crossing between West Malaysia and East Malaysia are served by Malaysia Airlines, AirAsia and Malindo Air while smaller domestic routes are supplemented by smaller airlines like MASwings, Firefly and Berjaya Air. Major cargo airlines include MASkargo and Transmile Air Services.

Kuala Lumpur International Airport is the main and busiest airport of Malaysia. In 2014, it was the world's 13th busiest airport by international passenger traffic, recording over 25.4 million international passenger traffic. It was also the world's 20th busiest airport by passenger traffic, recording over 48.9 million passengers.

Other major airports include Kota Kinabalu International Airport, which is also Malaysia's second busiest airport and busiest airport in East Malaysia with over 6.9 million passengers in 2013, and Penang International Airport, with over 5.4 million passengers in 2013.

Sea network

Malaysia is strategically located on the Strait of Malacca, one of the most important shipping lanes in the world.

Malaysia has two ports that are listed in the top 20 busiest ports in the world, Port Klang and Port of Tanjung Pelepas, which are respectively the 2nd and 3rd busiest ports in Southeast Asia after the Port of Singapore.

Port Klang is Malaysia's busiest port, and the 13th busiest port in the world in 2013, handling over 10.3 million TEUs. Port of Tanjung Pelepas is Malaysia's second busiest port, and the 19th busiest port in the world in 2013, handling over 7.6 million TEUs.

Free trade efforts

International trade agreements

Trade agreements under negotiation 
 Malaysia-EFTA Economic Partnership Agreement since 2012
 Malaysia–European Union Free Trade Agreement (MEUFTA)
 Trans-Pacific Partnership Agreement (TPP)
 Trade Prefential System-Organisation of Islamic Conference (TPS-OIC)
 Developing Eight (D-8) Preferential Tariff Agreement (PTA)

Investments

Malaysia's total accumulated investments in 2014 was RM235.9 billion, with 72.6 per cent (RM171.3 billion) being contributed by domestic sources and 27.4 per cent (RM64.6 billion) coming from foreign sources.

According to A.T. Kearney, a global management consulting firm, Malaysia was ranked 15th in the 2014 Foreign Direct Investment Confidence Index, 9th in 2012, 16th in 2007 and 21st in 2010. The index assesses the impact of political, economic and regulatory changes on the FDI intentions and preferences of the leaders of top companies around the world.

Largest public Malaysian companies

Fortune Global 500 
Malaysia has 1 company that rank in the Fortune Global 500 ranking for 2022.

Forbes Global 2000 
Malaysia has 8 companies that rank in the Forbes Global 2000 ranking for 2022.

See also
 List of Malaysian states by GDP
 Bamboo network

Notes

References

Further reading

External links
 Mahathir bin Mohamad's interview with the PBS series "Commanding Heights" on the subject of East Asian economic development.
 Key Statistics for Malaysia
 Economic Outlook by Economist Intelligence Unit 
 Banking in Malaysia
 Khazanah Nasional Berhad SWF Profile
 World Bank Summary Trade Statistics Malaysia
 Tariffs applied by Malaysia as provided by ITC's ITC Market Access Map, an online database of customs tariffs and market requirements

 
Malaysia